Sigrun Krokvik is the pen name of crime fiction writer Sigrun Karin Christiansen (born 1932). She made her literary debut in 1972 with the thriller Bortreist på ubestemt tid. She published the novel Kikkeren in 1973. She was awarded the Riverton Prize in 1972, and was the first recipient of this prize.

References

1932 births
Living people
20th-century Norwegian novelists
Norwegian crime fiction writers
Norwegian thriller writers
Norwegian women novelists
20th-century Norwegian women writers
Women crime fiction writers